This list of museums in Philadelphia, Pennsylvania encompasses museums defined for this context as institutions (including nonprofit organizations, government entities, and private businesses) that collect and care for objects of cultural, artistic, scientific, or historical interest and make their collections or related exhibits available for public viewing. Also included are university and non-profit art galleries.  Museums that exist only in cyberspace (i.e., virtual museums) are not included.

Current museums

Defunct museums
 Curtis Center Museum of Norman Rockwell Art, Philadelphia, closed in 1997
 National Philatelic Museum, Philadelphia, opened in 1948, closed in 1959
 Philadelphia Commercial Museum, closed in 1994
 Sweetbriar Mansion, closed since 2014; late 18th-century house located in west Fairmount Park; was operated by the Modern Club of Philadelphia from 1939 to 2014
 Neon Museum of Philadelphia, closed in 2022 after 2 years open

References

Museums
Philadelphia
Pennsylvania education-related lists